Iwate 4th district was a constituency of the House of Representatives in the Diet of Japan (national legislature). It was located in southwestern Iwate and consisted of the cities of Hanamaki, Kitakami and Ōshū as well as the Waga and Isawa Districts. As of 2012, 305,917 eligible voters were registered in the district.

Before the electoral reform of 1994, the area had been part of Iwate 2nd district where three Representatives had been elected by single non-transferable vote. In a 2017 reapportionment, Iwate lost one seat and was subdivided into three districts. The area of the old 4th district is now part of the new 3rd district

The only representative for Iwate 4th district from its creation in 1996 to its abolition has been former Liberal Democratic Party secretary-general Ichirō Ozawa (LDP→JRP→NFP→LP→DPJ→LF→TPJ→PLP).

List of representatives

Election results

References 

Districts of the House of Representatives (Japan)